Indas Assembly constituency is an assembly constituency in Bankura district in the Indian state of West Bengal. It is reserved for scheduled castes.

Overview
As per orders of the Delimitation Commission, No. 257 Indas Assembly constituency (SC) is composed of the following: Indas community development block; Balsi I, Balsi II, Biur Betur, Jamkuri and Kushdwip gram panchayats of Patrasayer community development block; and Laugram, Madanmohanpur gram panchayats of Kotulpur community development block.

Indas Assembly constituency is part of No. 37 Bishnupur (Lok Sabha constituency).

Members of Legislative Assembly

Election results

2011

.# Swing calculated on Congress+Trinamool Congress vote percentages taken together in 2006.

1977-2006
In the 2006 state assembly elections, Mahadeb Patra of CPI(M) won the Indas assembly seat defeating his nearest rival Basudeb Digar of Trinamool Congress. Contests in most years were multi cornered but only winners and runners are being mentioned. Nanda Dulal Majhi of CPI(M) defeated Purnima Lohar of Trinamool Congress in 2001, Naba Kumar Rajak of Congress in 1996 and Sanatan Santra of Congress in 1991. Badan Bora of CPI(M) defeated Piru Chandra Pandit of Congress in 1987, Gour Chandra Lohar of Congress in 1982 and Nabadurga of Janata Party in 1977.

1967-1972
Sanatan Santra of Congress won in 1972. Badan Bora of CPI(M) won in 1971. Abani Kumar Saha of Bangla Congress won in 1969. P.C.Mal of Bangla Congress in 1967. Prior to that the Indas seat did not exist.

References

Assembly constituencies of West Bengal
Politics of Bankura district